Sporolides A and B are polycyclic macrolides extracted from the obligate marine bacterium Salinispora tropica, which is found in ocean sediment. They  are composed of a chlorinated cyclopenta[a]indene ring and a cyclohexenone moiety. They were the second group of compounds (after salinosporamide A) isolated from Salinispora, and were said to indicate the potential of marine actinomycetes as a source of novel secondary metabolites. The structures and absolute stereochemistries of both metabolites were elucidated using a combination of NMR spectroscopy and X-ray crystallography.

The complex aromatic structure of the sporolides was hypothesized to be derived from an unstable nine-membered ring enediyne precursor, which could undergo Bergman cyclization to generate a para-benzyne intermediate. Nucleophilic attack by chloride would account for the 1:1 mixture of sporolide A and B and for the single chlorine in these enediyne-derived natural products. This proposed mechanism was demonstrated in laboratory experiments,

Biosynthesis
The biosynthesis of sporolide A and B is related to that of enediynes such as dynemicin A and is proposed to proceed as shown below.

Chemical synthesis
The first total synthesis of sporolide B was reported by K. C. Nicolaou's group and used a highly stereoselective and convergent strategy that involved two cycloaddition reactions. The first was a ruthenium-catalyzed intermolecular [2+2+2] cycloaddition reaction between two acetylenic units, A and B, and the second a thermally induced intramolecular [4+2] cycloaddition reaction between an o-quinone and the tetrasubstituted olefin within the intermediate, forming the macrocyclic structure of the target product.

References

Macrolides
Cyclohexenes
Heterocyclic compounds with 7 or more rings
Oxygen heterocycles
Epoxides